"Love Kills" is a song recorded by Belgian singer Roberto Bellarosa. The song was written by Jukka Immonen and Iain Farquharson. It is best known as Belgium's entry to the Eurovision Song Contest 2013 held in Malmö, Sweden. The song competed in the first semi-final on 14 May 2013 for a spot in the final on 18 May 2013. During the first semi-final, Belgium was voted into the final on 18 May 2013. In the final the song placed 12th with 71 points.

Background
On 16 December 2012, "Love Kills" was chosen as Belgium's Eurovision entry during a live radio show, aired on VivaCité. Co-writer Iain Farquharson wrote Azerbaijan's 2011 Eurovision winner, "Running Scared".

Track listing
Digital download 
 Love Kills – 3:00

Chart performance

References 

2013 singles
Eurovision songs of 2013
Eurovision songs of Belgium
Songs written by Jukka Immonen
Songs written by Iain James
2013 songs
Sony Music singles
English-language Belgian songs